Bucculatrix malivorella is a moth in the family Bucculatricidae. It was described in 2007 by Svetlana Vladimirovna Baryshnikova. It is found in Tajikistan.

References

Bucculatricidae
Moths described in 2007
Moths of Asia